Prinetti & Stucchi, later Stucchi & Co., was an Italian maker of sewing machines, bicycles and motorized vehicles, established in Milan in 1883. It was owned by engineers and politicians Augusto Stucchi and Giulio Prinetti (1851–1908).

Cycle manufacture
In 1892 Stucchi Prinetti & Stucchi began manufacturing bicycles.

In 1914 Alfonso Calzolari rode a Stucchi to victory in the Giro d'Italia, and the 1919 Giro d'Italia was won by Costante Girardengo on a Stucchi.

Motor manufacture
In 1899 Prinetti & Stucchi started manufacturing motorized tricycles and quadricycles. The Tipo 1, a motorized tricycle utilizing two De Dion engines and a Rochet-Schneider frame, was designed by Ettore Bugatti. In 1900 Bugatti participated in the Targa Rignano in a quadricycle.

As appears in the magazine "El Fígaro" on September 3, In 1899, the first motorcycle entered Havana, Cuba. A Prinetti & Stucchi brand tricycle. I had a benzine engine, Prinetti patent, design simple, easy to maneuver, based on a frame that joined the three wheels or support points; its engine was placed in the center of gravity, looking this one that made it a stable motorcycle on any type of surface. At those moments the French-made DeDion Bouton engine, led the motorized market.

In 1901 the company was renamed Stucchi & Co. when Giulio Prinetti left to become Italian minister of foreign affairs 1901-03.
The reorganisation also triggered Ettore Bugatti's emigration to France where he established the Bugatti car works.

Automobile production stopped in 1906.

Electrical company
The Stucchi-Prinetti family founded the Società Generale Elettrica dell'Adamello electric company in 1907.

Family
It is the owner of the Badia a Coltibuono castle in Tuscany.

See also

 List of bicycle parts
 List of Italian companies

References

 First motorcycle entered Havana, Cuba.
  Book: History of Motorcycles in Cuba.
  MOTOS EN CUBA - LAS MOTOS DE LA INDEPENDENCIA (1885-1940).
 

Cycle manufacturers of Italy
Defunct motor vehicle manufacturers of Italy
Milan motor companies
Quadricycles
Three-wheeled motor vehicles
Vehicle manufacturing companies established in 1883
Vehicle manufacturing companies disestablished in 1906
1883 establishments in Italy
1906 disestablishments in Italy
Veteran vehicles